Saowalak Pengngam (born 30 November 1996) is a Thai international footballer who plays as a striker for Chonburi.

She participated in the 2018 Asian Games, and 2019 FIFA Women's World Cup.

International goals

References

External links

1996 births
Living people
Women's association football forwards
Saowalak Pengngam
Saowalak Pengngam
Footballers at the 2018 Asian Games
2019 FIFA Women's World Cup players
Saowalak Pengngam
Saowalak Pengngam